Doloessa ochrociliella is a species of snout moth (family Pyralidae) in the genus Doloessa. It was described by Émile Louis Ragonot in 1893 and is known from Japan, Australia and Sri Lanka.

Description
The wingspan of the male is 18 mm and the female is 20 mm. The male is a very pale chestnut color. The forewings with curved antemedial line, the area beyond it suffused with rufous. A black discocellular specks and an obliquely curved postmedial line present. Fascia on underside of forewings and upperside of hindwings blackish. Female with base and costa of forewings deeper rufous, where the rest of the wings pale. The antemedial and postmedial lines and discocellular speck almost obsolete.

References

Moths described in 1893
Tirathabini
Moths of Japan